Trox oustaleti is an extinct species of hide beetle in the subfamily Troginae described from a fossil found in the Ypresian age Allenby Formation of British Columbia, Canada. Within the genus Trox, it is placed in the core subgenus Trox.

References

†oustaleti
Fossil taxa described in 1879
Extinct beetles